Brendan Maher (born 1989) is an Irish hurler.

Brendan Maher may also refer to:

Brendan Maher (Roscrea hurler) (born 1949), Irish hurler
Brendan Maher (psychologist) (1924–2009), American psychologist
Brendan Maher (director), director of Australian TV series